Baytu railway station is a railway station in Barmer district in Rajasthan state of India.

References

Railway stations in Barmer district
Jodhpur railway division